Yoshiie is both a masculine Japanese given name and a Japanese surname.

Possible writings
Yoshiie can be written using different combinations of kanji characters. Here are some examples:

義家, "justice, house"
吉家, "good luck, house"
善家, "virtuous, house"
芳家, "virtuous/fragrant, house"
良家, "good, house"
喜家, "rejoice, house"
慶家, "congratulate, house"

The name can also be written in hiragana よしいえ or katakana ヨシイエ.

Notable people with the given name Yoshiie
 (1039–1106), Japanese samurai
Yoshiie Tachibana (立花 義家, born 1958), Japanese baseball player and coach

Notable people with the surname Yoshiie
 (born 1971), Japanese politician

Japanese-language surnames
Japanese masculine given names